King of the Nordic Twilight is the first album in a trilogy by Luca Turilli's eponymous band. It was released in 1999 through Limb Music Productions.

The limited edition of this album comes in a digibook, with an expanded booklet. A video for the song "The Ancient Forest of Elves" is included as a hidden feature on the disc in .mov format.

Track 11 is unlisted on any form of the album. It is an a cappella rendition of a traditional Icelandic song by soprano Rannveig Sif Sigurdardottir. Sometimes the track is referred to by her name, or as "Lullaby", but the real name of this song is "Sofðu unga ástin mín" ("Sleep My Little Loved One")

Track listing

Credits
Band members
 Luca Turilli — guitars, additional keyboards
 Olaf Hayer — lead and backing vocals
 Sascha Paeth — bass, acoustic and additional guitars, guitar solo on "Where Heroes Lie", producer, engineer, mixing, mastering
 Miro — keyboards, piano, harpsichord, producer, choir arrangements and conduction
 Robert Hunecke-Rizzo — drums

Additional musicians
Opera Choir:
Sonja Pallasch, Heidrun Brockoff, Rosina Herrera-Sicilia, Ewald Bayerschmidt, Georg Mihalinov, Karl Heinz Kinsel, Jasinsky, Enrike Ochmann
Rannveig Sif Sigurdardottir - soprano voice
Epic Choir:
Thomas Rettke, Robert Hunecke-Rizzo, Cinzia Rizzo, Kirsten Metzing, Miro, Olaf Hayer
Matthias Brommann - first violin
Annette Berryman - flute
Bettina Jhrig - viola
Lord James David - narrator

Charts

References

Luca Turilli albums
1999 albums
Limb Music albums
Symphonic power metal albums